The Dual County League (DCL) is a dual county high school athletic conference in District A of the Massachusetts Interscholastic Athletic Association (MIAA).  The conference serves schools from Middlesex County and Suffolk County

Schools/Divisions 
The following eleven schools are a member of the Dual County League.

References 

Massachusetts Interscholastic Athletic Association leagues
Sports in Middlesex County, Massachusetts